The Marin Museum of Bicycling is a bicycle history museum in Fairfax, Marin County, California. It displays bicycles and related items from the 19th century to the present day. The museum opened in June 2015 and is home to the Mountain Bike Hall of Fame, founded in 1988 in Crested Butte, Colorado.

Collections
Exhibits include the Igler Collection of 19th-century cycles, arranged to show the evolution of the bicycle from the 1860s velocipede to the 1890s safety bicycle with pneumatic tires.  The museum has expanded the Mountain Bike Hall of Fame Collection to include many key bikes in the evolution of the mountain bike and to convey early mountain bike racing and the development of the mountain bike industry. The museum also includes a selection of 20th-century road, track, touring, and transportation bikes, a library and archive of cycling books and periodicals, and other related materials and artifacts.

Organization 
The museum was founded in 2013 by Joe Breeze, Otis Guy, and Marc Vendetti, all of whom are Mountain Bike Hall of Fame inductees, and Julia Violich, Keith Hastings and Lena Estrella. The museum is a 501(c)(3) non-profit organization and is all-volunteer run. The location functions as a cycling cultural center as well as a museum. The museum is open Thursday through Sunday, 11 am - 5 pm.

References

External links

 Phillips, Matt. Marin Museum of Bicycling Brings Cycling History to the Masses. June 2, 2015. Bicycling (Rodale Inc.)
 Marin Museum of Bicycling readies for June opening By Megan Hansen, Marin Independent Journal 04/19/2015
 California Bicycle Coalition » Marin Museum of Bicycling Opens
 New mountain-biking museum opens in Marin, birthplace of the sport by Sam McManis September 4, 2015 The Sacramento Bee

Museums in Marin County, California
Bicycle museums